Alexander Mungo Comine Russell (born 24 May 1998), known as Mungo Russell, is an English cricketer. 

He made his first-class debut on 1 April 2018 for Durham MCCU against Warwickshire as part of the Marylebone Cricket Club University fixtures. In June 2020 he received a half palatinate from Team Durham for his cricketing activities as a student.

References

External links
 

1998 births
Living people
English cricketers
Durham MCCU cricketers
Berkshire cricketers
English cricketers of the 21st century
Alumni of Collingwood College, Durham